The 2020–21 Hockey East men's ice hockey season was the 37th season of play for Hockey East and took place during the 2020–21 NCAA Division I men's ice hockey season. The start of the regular season was delayed until on November 20, 2020 and conclude on April 10, 2021. Massachusetts won its first national championship.

Season
Due to the ongoing COVID-19 pandemic, Hockey East was forced to delay the start to its season until mid-November. Even when team's began to play games, several programs were adversely affected by the virus. Boston University was particularly hard-hit by COVID and couldn't play their first game until January. Due to the strange nature of the season, Hockey East decided to use a Power Index to determine the conference standings. Additionally, all eleven members schools would be included in the conference tournament rather that the normal 8-team format.

Throughout the season, Boston College led in the standings and was in the top 3 for the national rankings. Behind the Eagles, the conference had at least 4 other teams with a national ranking. While it appeared that Hockey East could get as many as 6 bids into the tournament, several programs faded as the year progressed and only three conference teams ended up making the NCAA tournament.

Boston University, who had played well in their small number of games, fell to St. Cloud State in their opening match. BC was advanced to the second round after a COVID withdrawal and opened with a match against the same team. The result was much the same as St. Cloud overcame an early BC lead to take the game by a comfortable margin. In the Eastern region, meanwhile, Hockey East champion Massachusetts ran roughshod over their opponents. The Minutemen blew the door off of Lake Superior State in the first round and then dominated Bemidji State in the quarterfinals, surrendering just 1 goal in 120 minutes.

Entering the Frozen Four, UMass received awful news when several members were placed in COVID protocols due to contact tracing. Even worse was the fact that their starting goaltender, Filip Lindberg, was one of the players and would be forced to miss the rematch with defending national champion Minnesota Duluth. Massachusetts was able to keep the game close despite missing key players and managed to push the game into overtime. backup netminder Matt Murray played a masterful game, keeping UMD from scoring in the final 29 minutes of regulation and an additional 14 minutes of overtime. His stellar play enabled Garret Wait to score the winning goal for UMass and sent the team to their second straight championship match.

Prior to the final game, Lindberg ended up testing negative and drove overnight from Amherst to Pittsburgh so he could play in the title tilt. Lindberg turned in a solid performance but the entire team was responsible for Massachusetts' shutting down St. Cloud State. UMass took the game 5–0, the largest margin of victory in 11 years, and took home the program's first national championship. The win was the first for the conference since 2015 and ended the reign of the NCHC, who had possessed the crown ever since.

Standings

Coaches
Todd Woodcroft was hired as the 5th head coach for Vermont after the resignation of Kevin Sneddon.

Records

Statistics

Leading scorers
GP = Games played; G = Goals; A = Assists; Pts = Points

Leading goaltenders
Minimum 1/3 of team's minutes played in conference games.

GP = Games played; Min = Minutes played; W = Wins; L = Losses; T = Ties; GA = Goals against; SO = Shutouts; SV% = Save percentage; GAA = Goals against average

Conference tournament

NCAA tournament

Northeast Region

Regional semifinal
After seeding, Notre Dame, Boston College's opponent in the first round, was forced to withdraw due to COVID-19 positive tests. BC was automatically advanced to the second round by a no-contest decision.

Regional final

East Region

Regional semifinals

Regional final

Frozen Four

National semifinal

National Championship

Ranking

USCHO

USA Today

Awards

NCAA

Hockey East

Conference tournament

NCAA tournament

2021 NHL Entry Draft

† incoming freshman

References

External links

2020–21 Hockey East men's ice hockey season
Hockey East
2020–21